Giancarlo Bacci (17 June 1931 – 27 May 2014) was an Italian footballer who played as a forward.

Born in Peretola, Florence, he was one of the most notable journeymen in the Serie A, where he played for 8 teams (A.S. Lucchese Libertas 1905, A.S. Roma, Udinese Calcio, Bologna F.C. 1909, ACF Fiorentina, A.C. Torino, A.C. Milan and Calcio Padova) for a total of 255 games and 93 goals.

He was on the season's top 10 Serie A scorers list for three seasons in a row from 1952–53 to 1954–55 for three teams.

References

1931 births
2014 deaths
Italian footballers
Serie A players
Serie B players
S.S.D. Lucchese 1905 players
A.S. Roma players
Udinese Calcio players
Bologna F.C. 1909 players
ACF Fiorentina players
Torino F.C. players
A.C. Milan players
Calcio Padova players
Cosenza Calcio 1914 players
Association football forwards